Michael Seifert may refer to:

 Michael Seifert (producer), music producer, writer, arranger and recording engineer
 Michael Seifert (programmer) (born 1969), Danish computer programmer, inventor and businessman
 Michael Seifert (SS guard) (1924–2010), SS guard in Italy during World War II
 Mike Seifert, American football defensive end